Foroys ('Forward') was a Bundist fortnightly Yiddish-language newspaper published from Mexico City. In the early 1960s, it had a circulation of around 2,000. Editors included I. Rotenberg, S. Jezior and S. Tsfas.

References

Ashkenazi Jewish culture in Mexico
Bundism in North America
Defunct newspapers published in Mexico
European-Jewish culture in Mexico
Jewish anti-Zionism in North America
Jews and Judaism in Mexico City
Newspapers published in Mexico
Yiddish newspapers
Yiddish culture in North America